Christof Duffner (born 16 December 1971) is a West German/German former ski jumper.

Career
He won a gold medal in the team large hill event at the 1994 Winter Olympics in Lillehammer. Duffner also won two medals in the team large hill event at the FIS Nordic World Ski Championships with gold in 1999 and silver in 1997. His only World cup victory was in 1992 in Oberstdorf.

On 22 March 1992, he crashed at world record distance at 194 metres (636 ft) at FIS Ski Flying World Championships 1992 in Harrachov, Czechoslovakia.

On 18 March 1994, he crashed at world record distance at 207 metres (679 ft) at FIS Ski Flying World Championships 1994 in Planica, Slovenia.

World Cup

Standings

Wins

Invalid ski jumping world records

 Not recognized! Crash at world record distance.

References

External links
 
 
 

1971 births
Living people
German male ski jumpers
Ski jumpers at the 1992 Winter Olympics
Ski jumpers at the 1994 Winter Olympics
Ski jumpers at the 2002 Winter Olympics
Olympic ski jumpers of Germany
Olympic medalists in ski jumping
FIS Nordic World Ski Championships medalists in ski jumping
Medalists at the 1994 Winter Olympics
Olympic gold medalists for Germany
People from Schwarzwald-Baar-Kreis
Sportspeople from Freiburg (region)